Paluzzi is a surname. Notable people with the surname include:

Gaspare Paluzzi degli Albertoni (1566–1614), Italian Roman Catholic Bishop, and Apostolic Collector to Portugal 
Paluzzo Paluzzi Altieri degli Albertoni (1623–1698), Italian Catholic Cardinal and Cardinal-Nephew to Pope Clement X

Luciana Paluzzi (born 1937), Italian-American actress
Rinaldo Paluzzi (1927–2013), American-Spanish painter and sculptor